Mountain Bike Rally, also released as Cannondale Cup in North America, is a Super Nintendo Entertainment System bicycle racing video game that is a simulation of real mountain biking. The player can choose from many characters and many mountain bikes ranging from mediocre to excellent in many categories. It was the first game to support the Life Fitness Entertainment System, an exercise bike peripheral for the Super Nintendo. The Cannondale Cup release has the same graphics as the Mountain Bike Rally release, but the names of the racers, bikes, and locations were all altered.

Gameplay
The player starts in qualifying, and can eventually qualify for the regionals, nationals, the championship, and the final race, in which they must get first place in order to beat the game.

There are a selection of cyclists, including a demon, a California surfer, and a ninja. Each character has a different catchphrase for winning, being in first, being in second, being in third, and everything in between. The only violence in this game comes from the onlookers who throw objects at the bikers to cause damage. Even after being hit several times, the bike is never destroyed. Finding a repair bonus on the track can fix the damage and make the bicycle run faster again. There are also bonuses on the track for points and energy, which gives the player more strength to push the bicycle to the limits.

Reception
GamePro gave the game a generally positive review, saying it "mixes racing realism and surrealism." They criticized the lack of digitized voices but praised the Mode 7 effects, airborne animations, numerous options, and good controls.

References

1994 video games
Cycling video games
Fitness games
North America-exclusive video games
Racing video games
Radical Entertainment games
Super Nintendo Entertainment System games
Super Nintendo Entertainment System-only games
Video games developed in Canada
ASC Games games
Single-player video games